Ibrahim Adamu Kolo (29 October 1956 – 3 November 2018) was a Niger academic. He lived in Mokwa Local Government Area of Niger State.

He attended UMCA Primary School and St. Johns Anglican primary school. He went to high school in the Government College Bida and earned his advanced degrees from the College of Education in Sokoto, Bayero University, and University of Jos.

Career 
He was a lecturer in Faculty of Education, Bayero University Kano. He served as Provost of Niger State College Of Education, from 2001 to 2010.

Vice Chancellor
He served as Vice Chancellor Ibrahim Badamasi Babangida University, Lapai, from 2010 to 2015. Commissioner for Higher Education Peter Sarki announced Kolo's appointment as Vice Chancellor, emphasizing the need to sanitize the university and repair administrative decay.

Death
Kolo died in Minna at age 62 after a brief illness. General Ibrahim Babangida described Kolo's death as "“a great loss to the Niger State education sector and Nigeria as a whole".

References

Sources 
 

1956 births
2018 deaths
Nigerian Muslims
Academic staff of Bayero University Kano
Academic staff of Ibrahim Badamasi Babangida University
Vice-Chancellors of Nigerian universities